The Brooklyn Public Library consists of a Central Library, a Business & Career Library, and 58 neighborhood branches in the New York City borough of Brooklyn. Eighteen libraries are historic Carnegie libraries. The Brooklyn Public Library also has five adult learning centers.

The Brooklyn Public Library is one of three separate and independent public library systems in New York City. The other two are the New York Public Library (serving the Bronx, Manhattan, and Staten Island), and the Queens Library (serving Queens).

Libraries

See also
 List of Carnegie libraries in New York City
 List of New York Public Library branches
 List of Queens Library branches

References

External links
 Locations  Brooklyn Public Library

Brooklyn Public Library

Brooklyn
Brooklyn Public Library
New York, Brooklyn